Professor Akbar Masood is the Vice Chancellor at Baba Ghulam Shah Badshah University in Jammu and Kashmir. Before joining Baba Ghulam Shah Badshah University, he served as the Dean of Academic Affairs at the University of Kashmir. He has a Master of Sciences from Aligarh Muslim University and a PhD from the Indian Institute of Toxicology Research. He remained associated with the Department of Biochemistry at the University of Kashmir as a member of the faculty since 1988.
 He was appointed Vice-Chancellor of Baba Ghulam Shah Badshah University in February 2021.

Masood remained the Head Department of Biochemistry, University of Kashmir for 18 years. He also remained Dean Faculty of Biological Sciences and Dean Faculty of Unani and Ayurvedic Medicine at University of Kashmir. He has more than 250 publications in national and international Journals and has attended national and international seminars, symposia, workshops and conferences. He has been an active researcher in the field of environmental biochemistry, phytotoxicology, protein biochemistry, enzymology, medicinal plants and bioinformatics. He has written 15 books and has supervised 50 Ph.D and M.Phil degrees during his career over three decades of teaching and research. For his contributions, he was awarded a National Environmental Science Academy fellowship in 2005 and International Benevolent Research Fellowship in 2006. In 2007, he was awarded fellowship by International Biotechnology Society, Indore and fellowship by society of Toxicology, India. In 2008, he was elected as an associate of the Society of Toxicologic Pathology, Reston VA, USA. He was awarded a fellowship of Linnean Society of London in 2008. In 2010, he was awarded Pioneers in Genomic Education award by Ocimumbio USA in 2010 and was elected as a fellow of the Royal Society of Chemists, England. He was rated as excellent teacher by the Directorate of Internal Quality Assurance University of Kashmir.

References

External links 
https://www.bgsbu.ac.in/

Indian academic administrators
Year of birth missing (living people)
Living people
Universities in Jammu and Kashmir